I Bet may refer to:

 "I Bet" (Ciara song), 2015
 "I Bet" (TLC song), 2005